Swami  is a Marathi novel by Ranjit Desai.

It was published in 1962. Desai received several awards for the novel including the Sahitya Akademi Award in 1964.  It is set in Maharashtra, India, during the regime of fourth Peshwa Madhavrao. It is a very sensitive and touching portrayal of Madhavrao's life and his relationship with his wife Ramabai.

The novel was later adapted into Marathi TV series of the same name in 1987.

References 

1962 novels
20th-century Indian novels
Marathi-language literature
Novels set in Maharashtra
1962 Indian novels